NCAA Division III independent schools are teams that compete in NCAA ice hockey but are not members of a conference. There are also several current and former schools that previously competed as Division III independents.

Current independent programs

Men

Women

Current programs which were previously independent
The NCAA did not start numerical classification until 1973. Prior to that teams played either in the University Division, which became Division I, or the College Division, which was split into Divisions II and III. Independent teams prior to 1973 are outlined on the Division II page.

Men

Women

Defunct teams

Men

† Prior to 1973 Division III did not exist. Teams played in the College Division which was divided into the second- and third-tier during reclassification.

Women

See also
 List of NCAA Division III ice hockey programs
 NCAA Division III independent schools
 NCAA Division I independent schools (ice hockey)
 NCAA Division II independent schools (ice hockey)

References

NCAA Division III Independents
Independents, ice hockey

Ice
Independent